Tony Reed (born March 30, 1955) is an American former college and professional football player.  A star at Colorado, he played five professional seasons as a running back from 1977-1981. When he was in Kansas City he wore number 32. Rushing the ball his stats were 2,340 total rushing yards, 8 rushing Touchdowns. Receiving Statistics are 1,699 receiving yards and two touchdowns. He played 71 Games. Prior to transferring to Colorado, Reed played at Antelope Valley College in Lancaster, California after moving from Japan. around the time his father had been stationed in the military. His addition to what was, at that time, a small town junior college football team caused a remarkable stir in the support of the program from the community.

1955 births
Living people
Players of American football from San Francisco
American football running backs
Colorado Buffaloes football players
Kansas City Chiefs players
Denver Broncos players